The second Kok cabinet, also called the second Purple cabinet was the executive branch of the Dutch government from 3 August 1998 until 22 July 2002. The cabinet was a continuation of the previous first Kok cabinet and was formed by the social-democratic Labour Party (PvdA), the conservative-liberal People's Party for Freedom and Democracy (VVD) and the social-liberal Democrats 66 after the election of 1998. The cabinet was a centrist grand coalition and had a substantial majority in the House of Representatives with Labour Leader Wim Kok serving as Prime Minister. Prominent Liberal politician Annemarie Jorritsma the Minister of Transport and Water Management in the previous cabinet served as Deputy Prime Minister and Minister of Economic Affairs, former Progressive-Liberal Leader Els Borst continued as Minister of Health, Welfare and Sport and served as Deputy Prime Minister.

The cabinet served during the economic expansion of the late 1990s and early unstable 2000s. Domestically, it was able to implement several major social reforms such as legalizing same-sex marriage, and had to deal with the assassination of Pim Fortuyn. Internationally, it had to deal with several crises such as the fallout of the Srebrenica massacre and the response to September 11 attacks. The cabinet suffered several major internal and external conflicts including multiple cabinet resignations; the cabinet itself resigned prematurely on two occasions: first following a major political crisis in May 1999, and second, following the conclusions of a report into the Srebrenica massacre on 16 April 2002 and continued in a demissionary capacity until it was replaced following the election of 2002.

Formation
The new cabinet was the successor of the First Kok cabinet (First Purple cabinet) and was formed from the same coalition of Labour Party, People's Party for Freedom and Democracy and Democrats 66. It was also known as the 'tweede paarse kabinet' ('second purple cabinet') called such because it contained both the social-democratic Labour Party (red) and the liberal People's Party for Freedom and Democracy (blue).

Term
The aim of the cabinet was to continue the policy of cabinet Kok I, which was concerned with economizing, tax reduction and making an end to unemployment. Wim Kok was the Prime Minister, Annemarie Jorritsma as the Deputy Prime Minister for the People's Party for Freedom and Democracy, and Els Borst for Democrats 66. The cabinet was considered boring, because both left-wing and right-wing political parties were a part of it. There was no strong opposition in the parliament. The cabinet completed processes of liberalisation which were started by the previous cabinet: the legalisation of prostitution in 2000, same-sex marriage in 2001 and Euthanasia in 2002. This cabinet was notable for resigning twice. The first time was in May 1999, when Democrats 66 stepped out of the coalition when proposed legislation entered by this party was blocked; through negotiations the crisis was solved and the cabinet stayed together. The second and final time was on 16 April 2002, just one month before the next election, when Prime Minister Kok wished to resign over the NIOD report into the genocide of Srebrenica in 1995 and the other ministers had no choice but to follow him. The Second Kok cabinet remained in place as a Demissionary cabinet until 22 July 2002, when it was replaced by the First Balkenende cabinet.

Changes
On 7 June 1999 Minister of Agriculture, Nature and Fisheries Haijo Apotheker (D66) resigned citing that as a former Mayor he couldn't adjust to national politics. Minister of Social Affairs and Employment Klaas de Vries (PvdA) served as acting Minister of Agriculture, Nature and Fisheries until 9 June 1999 when Member of the European Parliament Laurens Jan Brinkhorst (D66), a former State Secretary for Foreign Affairs was appointed as his successor.

On 13 March 2000 Minister of the Interior and Kingdom Relations Bram Peper (PvdA) resigned after a report was released about inappropriate declarations he had made when he served as Mayor of Rotterdam. Minister for Integration and Urban Planning Roger van Boxtel (D66) served as acting Minister of the Interior and Kingdom Relations until 24 March 2000 when Minister of Social Affairs and Employment Klaas de Vries (PvdA) was installed as his successor. That same day State Secretary for Finance Willem Vermeend (PvdA) was appointed as Minister of Social Affairs and Employment and Member of the House of Representatives Wouter Bos (PvdA) was installed as State Secretary for Finance.

On 1 January 2001 State Secretary for Justice Job Cohen (PvdA) resigned after he was appointed as Mayor of Amsterdam. That same day Member of the House of Representatives Ella Kalsbeek (PvdA) was installed as his successor.

Cabinet members

Trivia
 Seven cabinet members had previous experience as scholars and professors: Els Borst (Medical Ethics), Bram Peper (Social Economics), Gerrit Zalm (Political Economics), Willem Vermeend (Fiscal Law), Laurens Jan Brinkhorst (International Law and Relations), Job Cohen (Jurisprudence) and Rick van der Ploeg (Macroeconomics).
 Seven cabinet members (later) served as Party Leaders: Wim Kok (1986–2001), Wouter Bos (2002–2010), Job Cohen (2010–2012) of the Labour Party, Gerrit Zalm (2002–2004) and Jozias van Aartsen (2004–2006) of the People's Party for Freedom and Democracy, Els Borst (1998) and Laurens Jan Brinkhorst (1982) of the Democrats 66.
 Eleven cabinet members (later) served as Mayor: Annemarie Jorritsma (Delfzijl and Almere), Bram Peper (Rotterdam), Jozias van Aartsen (The Hague and Amsterdam), Loek Hermans (Zwolle), Tineke Netelenbos (Ede, Haarlemmermeer and Oud-Beijerland), Haijo Apotheker (Muntendam, Veendam, Leeuwarden, Steenwijk, Steenwijkerland, Sneek, Súdwest-Fryslân, Waadhoeke and Noardeast-Fryslân), Job Cohen (Amsterdam), Henk van Hoof (Delfzijl), Annelies Verstand (Heteren and Zutphen), Geke Faber (Zeewolde, Wageningen, Den Helder and Zaanstad) and Johan Remkes (The Hague).

References

External links
Official

  Kabinet-Kok II Parlement & Politiek
  Kabinet-Kok II Rijksoverheid

Cabinets of the Netherlands
1998 establishments in the Netherlands
2002 disestablishments in the Netherlands
Cabinets established in 1998
Cabinets disestablished in 2002
Grand coalition governments